Mikalay Fastaw (born 29 May 1990) is a Belarusian former professional footballer.

External links

1990 births
Living people
Belarusian footballers
Association football midfielders
FC Neman Grodno players
FC Smorgon players
FC Dnepr Mogilev players
FC Lida players
FC Volna Pinsk players